Catherine Marie Cortez Masto (born March 29, 1964) is an American lawyer and politician serving as the senior United States senator from Nevada, a seat she has held since 2017. A member of the Democratic Party, Cortez Masto served as the 32nd attorney general of Nevada from 2007 to 2015.

Cortez Masto graduated from University of Nevada, Reno and Gonzaga University School of Law. She worked four years as a civil attorney in Las Vegas and two years as a criminal prosecutor for the U.S. Attorney's Office in Washington, D.C. before being elected Nevada attorney general in 2006, replacing George Chanos. Reelected in 2010, she was not eligible to run for a third term in 2014 because of lifetime term limits established by the Constitution of Nevada.

Cortez Masto narrowly defeated Republican Joe Heck in the 2016 United States Senate election in Nevada to replace outgoing Democratic senator Harry Reid, becoming the first woman elected to represent Nevada in the Senate and the first Latina elected to serve in the upper chamber. She took office on January 3, 2017, and became Nevada's senior senator in January 2019, when Dean Heller left the Senate following his defeat. She was narrowly reelected in 2022, defeating Republican nominee Adam Laxalt.

Early life and education 
Cortez Masto was born in Las Vegas, Nevada, the daughter of Joanna (née Musso) and Manny Cortez. Her father, an attorney, was the longtime head of the Las Vegas Convention and Visitors Authority and served as a member of the Clark County Commission. Now deceased, Manny Cortez had a long-standing friendship with Harry Reid. Her father was of Mexican descent, and her mother is of Italian ancestry. Her paternal grandfather, Eduardo Cortez, immigrated to Nevada from Chihuahua, Mexico.

Cortez Masto attended Ed W. Clark High School, and earned a Bachelor of Science degree in finance from the University of Nevada, Reno in 1986 and a Juris Doctor from Gonzaga University School of Law in 1990.

Early career 
Cortez Masto was admitted to the State Bar of Nevada in 1990, the U.S. District Court, District of Nevada in 1991, and the U.S. Court of Appeals for the Ninth Circuit in 1994. Her career includes four years as a civil attorney in Las Vegas and two as a criminal prosecutor for the U.S. Attorney's Office in Washington, D.C. She also served as former Nevada Governor Bob Miller's chief of staff.

In November 2003, Cortez Masto was named executive vice chancellor of the Nevada System of Higher Education. There was some controversy, because she was hired directly by the chancellor, not the university system's board of regents; the chancellor said the regents had recommended that he hire an assistant, and in December the board voted unanimously to approve her annual salary of $215,000.

Nevada Attorney General 

Cortez Masto was the Democratic nominee for state attorney general in 2006 and defeated Republican nominee Don Chairez 59% to 36%, with 5% for "None of these". She was reelected in 2010, defeating Republican Travis Barrick 52% to 36%, with 8% for Independent American candidate Joel F. Hansen and 4% for "None of these".

In 2009, Cortez Masto's office launched an investigation into Brian Krolicki, then Nevada's Republican lieutenant governor. Krolicki faced felony charges related to allegations that he mishandled the Nevada College Savings Trust Fund when he was state treasurer. During the investigation, the Las Vegas Review-Journal discovered that Cortez Masto's husband, Paul, planned to host a fundraising party for Robert S. Randazzo, a Democratic candidate for lieutenant governor, four days before the attorney general's office was scheduled to prosecute Krolicki. Cortez Masto said she was unaware of the fundraising party. The charges against Krolicki were ultimately dismissed in Clark County District Court. The dismissal of charges against Krolicki was regarded as a political setback for Cortez Masto, who, according to the Las Vegas Sun, "opened herself to charges of politicizing her office and prosecutorial misconduct".

In 2010, Cortez Masto's office began investigating Bank of America, accusing the company of raising interest rates on troubled borrowers. Her office sought to end Nevada's participation in a loan modification settlement in order to sue the bank over deceptive marketing and lending practices. Bank of America denied any wrongdoing. The lawsuit was settled in 2012 for $750 million for lien reductions and short sales.

Cortez Masto defended the state of Nevada in the lawsuit Sevcik v. Sandoval. The suit challenged Nevada's denial of same-sex marriage, as prohibited by the state's constitution and statutory law. After initially defending the same-sex marriage ban, Cortez Masto and the state abandoned their defense in light of a ruling by the United States Court of Appeals for the Ninth Circuit.

U.S. Senate

Elections

2016 

Cortez Masto declined to run for governor of Nevada in the 2014 election. When U.S. Senator Harry Reid decided not to run for reelection in the 2016 election, he endorsed her as his successor. Cortez Masto's campaign relied heavily on the political infrastructure Reid had assembled. Her Republican opponent was U.S. Representative Joe Heck.

Cortez Masto, who supports increased investments in renewable energy technology, was supported by the League of Conservation Voters. She was also financially supported by pro-choice groups, such as EMILY's List and Planned Parenthood, and by End Citizens United, a political action committee seeking to overturn Citizens United v. FEC.

Cortez Masto won 47% of the vote (520,658 votes) to Heck's 45% (494,427 votes). While Heck carried 16 of Nevada's counties and its equivalents, Cortez Masto won Clark County, home to over 70% of the state's population, by over 82,000 votes, over three times her statewide margin of 27,000 votes. She took office on January 3, 2017, becoming the first Latina in the U.S. Senate.

2022 

On February 24, 2021, Cortez Masto announced that she would run for reelection in 2022. Among her challengers was her successor as attorney general and 2018 nominee for governor Adam Laxalt. Cortez Masto trailed in many polls and was widely seen as the most vulnerable incumbent Democratic U.S. senator. But she defeated Laxalt, securing a second term.

Tenure

117th Congress (2021–23)
Cortez Masto was participating in the certification of the 2021 United States Electoral College vote count when Trump supporters stormed the U.S. Capitol. She was on the Senate floor, preparing to speak, when the Capitol was breached. Cortez Masto could hear the attackers just outside the chamber, which was secured by Capitol Police. As the attackers neared the chamber, she and her fellow senators were moved to an undisclosed secure location. Cortez Masto tweeted while sheltering in place, calling the attack "un-American and unacceptable".

Committee assignments 
 Committee on Banking, Housing, and Urban Affairs
 Subcommittee on Economic Policy
 Subcommittee on Financial Institutions and Consumer Protection
 Subcommittee on Securities, Insurance, and Investment
 Committee on Energy and Natural Resources
 Subcommittee on Energy
 Subcommittee on Public Lands, Forests and Mining (Chair)
 Committee on Rules and Administration
 Committee on Commerce, Science, and Transportation
 Subcommittee on Communications, Technology, Innovation, and the Internet
 Subcommittee on Consumer Protection, Product Safety, Insurance and Data Security
 Committee on Indian Affairs
 Special Committee on Aging

Caucus memberships 
 Congressional Hispanic Caucus
 Congressional Caucus for Women's Issues

Political positions 

As of October 2022, Cortez Masto has voted in line with Joe Biden's stated position 92.9% of the time.

Cannabis 
Cortez Masto cosponsored the bipartisan STATES Act proposed in the 115th U.S. Congress by senators Elizabeth Warren and Cory Gardner that would exempt individuals or corporations in compliance with state cannabis laws from federal enforcement of the Controlled Substances Act.

Environment 
Cortez Masto recognizes the existence of human-caused climate change and believes that the federal government should limit power plants' greenhouse gas emissions. She supports the growth of green jobs and increasing Nevada's reliance on solar power and other forms of clean energy. She opposes the use of Yucca Mountain as a nuclear waste repository.

Filibuster 
Cortez Masto supports reforming the filibuster of the United States Senate into a talking filibuster.

Foreign policy 
In October 2017, Cortez Masto condemned the genocide of the Rohingya Muslim minority in Myanmar and called for a stronger response to the crisis.

In April 2019, Cortez Masto was one of 34 senators to sign a letter criticizing Donald Trump for cutting off foreign assistance to El Salvador, Guatemala, and Honduras.

Gun policy 
The National Rifle Association (NRA) has given Cortez Masto an F grade because of her support for gun control. During the 2016 election, the organization spent $1 million on an attack ad against her. Cortez Masto opposes allowing people on the terrorist watchlist to buy guns, saying that "makes no sense".

In response to the 2017 Las Vegas shooting, she co-sponsored a bill with Dianne Feinstein to ban bump stocks. She said that it can be a start toward decreasing gun violence and mass shootings.

Health care 
Cortez Masto does not support the repeal of the Affordable Care Act (also known as Obamacare). She does support improving upon the act, which she has called "imperfect". She has co-sponsored the Marketplace Certainty Act to bring more stability to the health insurance marketplace.

Housing 
In April 2019, Cortez Masto was one of 41 senators to sign a bipartisan letter to the housing subcommittee asking for increased funding for the U.S. Department of Housing and Urban Development's Section 4 Capacity Building.

Immigration 
In April 2018, Cortez Masto was one of five senators to send a letter to acting director of ICE Thomas Homan about the standards the agency uses to determine how to detain pregnant women.

In June 2019, following the Housing and Urban Development Department's confirmation that DACA recipients did not meet eligibility for federal backed loans, Cortez Masto and 11 other senators introduced the Home Ownership Dreamers Act, legislation that mandated that the federal government was not authorized to deny mortgage loans backed by the Federal Housing Administration, Fannie Mae, Freddie Mac, or the Agriculture Department solely due to applicants' immigration status.

In July 2019, Cortez Masto and 15 other Senate Democrats introduced the Protecting Sensitive Locations Act, which mandated that ICE agents get approval from a supervisor ahead of engaging in enforcement actions at sensitive locations, except in special circumstances, and that agents receive annual training in addition to being required to report annually on enforcement actions in those locations.

LGBT rights 
Cortez Masto supports same-sex marriage.

Reproductive rights 

Cortez Masto supports legalized abortion. In the 2016 election, she was endorsed by Planned Parenthood and funded by their action fund.

She does not believe that companies should be allowed to withhold coverage for birth control based on religious beliefs.

Personal life 
Cortez Masto lives in Las Vegas with her husband, Paul Masto, a retired United States Secret Service special agent. She is Roman Catholic.

Electoral history

See also 
 List of female state attorneys general in the United States
 List of Hispanic and Latino Americans in the United States Congress
 Women in the United States Senate

References

External links 

 Senator Catherine Cortez Masto official U.S. Senate website
 Catherine Cortez Masto for Senate  campaign website
 
 

|-

|-

|-

|-

|-

1964 births
21st-century American politicians
21st-century American women politicians
American gun control activists
American politicians of Mexican descent
American Roman Catholics
Democratic Party United States senators from Nevada
Female United States senators
Gonzaga University School of Law alumni
Hispanic and Latino American members of the United States Congress
Hispanic and Latino American women in politics
Living people
Nevada Attorneys General
Nevada Democrats
Nevada lawyers
Politicians from Carson City, Nevada
Politicians from Las Vegas
University of Nevada, Reno alumni
Women in Nevada politics
American people of Italian descent
Catholics from Nevada